The Charente is a  long river in southwestern France.  
Its source is in the Haute-Vienne département at Chéronnac, a small village near Rochechouart. It flows through the departments of Haute-Vienne, Charente, Vienne and Charente-Maritime. The river flows into the Atlantic Ocean near Rochefort.

Navigation
The Charente was described by the French king François I as 'the most beautiful river in the kingdom', and was navigable in its natural state until mills were erected at many locations in the 14th century. Some locks were built but through navigation remained impossible for centuries. Improvements to the navigation were projected under Louis XVI in 1772, but work was interrupted by the Revolution. The project was revived under the Restoration and canalisation completed in 1835. The waterway was abandoned in 1957. The départements took over operation in 1963, and recreational vessels have now taken possession of the waterway throughout the 164 km to the town of Angoulême. 

The historic towns of Cognac, Jarnac, Saintes and Rochefort make the river a popular destination for boaters, mainly in rental boats, with moorings provided at most towns and villages along the route.

Tributaries
Tributaries include the rivers Antenne, Boëme, Né, Coran, Seugne, Bramerit, Boutonne, Arnoult, Touvre and Bonnieure.

The river Boutonne is navigable over a distance of 31 km to Saint-Jean-d'Angély, but a barrier at the confluence prevents access except under exceptional conditions.

En route
Towns and villages include Vergeroux, Soubise, Rochefort and Tonnay-Charente on the tidal river, and Saint-Savinien, Taillebourg, Saintes, Cognac, Jarnac, Saint-Simon and Angoulême on the navigable river, while Montignac-Charente and Civray are on the river's upper course.

See also
 Kaolin deposits of the Charentes Basin

References

External links
River Charente and River Boutonne, with maps and details for navigation, by the author of Inland Waterways of France, referenced above 
Navigation details for 80 French rivers and canals (French waterways website section)

Rivers of France
 
Rivers of Charente
Rivers of Charente-Maritime
Rivers of Haute-Vienne
Rivers of Vienne
Rivers of Nouvelle-Aquitaine